The Choir of the Orthodox Church of Beirut was founded in 1992 by مارسيل خوري (Marcél Khourie). The choir provide for the daily offices and celebrations of the Mass at the Greek Orthodox Archdiocese of Beirut.

The Choir comprises 3 boy and 2 girls choristers, aged between nine and 13 years, and 14 male undergraduates, reading for degrees in a variety of subjects. There are also two organ scholars.

The Choir's first Album 'Anacheed Al Kanissa Al Orthodoxia' which had been recorded back in 1995 was released officially on major digital distributors in 2017 and was met with critical acclaim by the Arab Christian community.

Discography
The following recordings were mainly released by Quartos
 Anachheed Al Kanissa Al Orthodoxia (2017)
  Orthodox Sacred Chant Byzantine Music (2017)

References

External links
 
 https://web.archive.org/web/20170929135551/http://beirutchants.com/index.php/speakers/dec-17-a/
 The Independent

Music organisations based in Lebanon